Medieval architecture is  architecture common in the Middle Ages, and includes religious, civil, and military buildings. Styles include pre-Romanesque, Romanesque, and Gothic. While most of the surviving medieval architecture is to be seen in churches and castles, examples of civic and domestic architecture can be found throughout Europe, in manor houses, town halls, almshouses, bridges, and residential houses.

Designs

Religious architecture

The Latin cross plan, common in medieval ecclesiastical architecture, takes the Roman basilica as its primary model with subsequent developments. It consists of a nave, transepts, and the altar stands at the east end (see Cathedral diagram). Also, cathedrals influenced or commissioned by Justinian employed the Byzantine style of domes and a Greek cross (resembling a plus sign), with the altar located in the sanctuary on the east side of the church.

Military architecture

Surviving examples of medieval secular architecture mainly served for defense. Castles and fortified walls provide the most notable remaining non-religious examples of medieval architecture. Windows gained a cross-shape for more than decorative purposes, they provided a perfect fit for a crossbowman to safely shoot invaders from inside. Crenellated walls (battlements) provided shelters for archers on the roofs to hide behind when not shooting invaders.

Civic architecture

While much of the surviving medieval architecture is either religious or military, examples of civic and even domestic architecture can be found throughout Europe. Examples include manor houses, town halls, almshouses and bridges, but also residential houses.

Styles

Pre-Romanesque

European architecture in the Early Middle Ages may be divided into Early Christian, Romanesque architecture, Russian church architecture, Norse architecture, Pre-Romanesque, including Merovingian, Carolingian, Ottonian, and Asturian. While these terms are problematic, they nonetheless serve adequately as entries into the era.  Considerations that enter into histories of each period include Trachtenberg's "historicising" and "modernising" elements, Italian versus northern, Spanish, and Byzantine elements, and especially the religious and political maneuverings between kings, popes, and various ecclesiastic officials.

Romanesque

Romanesque, prevalent in medieval Europe during the 11th and 12th centuries, was the first pan-European style since Roman Imperial architecture and examples are found in every part of the continent. The term was not contemporary with the art it describes, but rather, is an invention of modern scholarship based on its similarity to Roman Architecture in forms and materials. Romanesque is characterized by a use of round or slightly pointed arches, barrel vaults, and cruciform piers supporting vaults. Romanesque buildings are widely known throughout Europe.

The spread of Romanesque architecture through Europe has been described as "revolutionary". This style is sometimes called Anglo-Norman, though it continues under the Angevin and Plantagenet rulers. Motifs of Roman origin were common to Norman and Anglo-Saxon architectural styles. Though usually classed broadly as "Romanesque", the period of architecture can now be divided into two stages. The first stage from 1070 A.D. to 1100 A.D. saw the style emerge during the rebuilding of many great churches, cathedrals, and monasteries (surviving examples include the Durham Cathedral, Norwich Cathedral and the Peterborough Cathedral). The second stage lasted from 1100 A.D. to 1170 A.D. when many smaller churches were built and renovated. During this time, the style became more detailed and ornamental. Identifying these latter churches is made difficult due to something called the Saxo-Norman overlap, where many Anglo-Saxon aspects are present in the masonry. The Church at Kilpeck is identified as 12th century based on its shallow and flat buttresses, emphatic corbel table and apse.

Gothic

The various elements of Gothic architecture emerged in a number of 11th and 12th century building projects, particularly in the Île de France area, but were first combined to form what we would now recognise as a distinctively Gothic style at the 12th century abbey church of Saint-Denis in Saint-Denis, near Paris.  Verticality is emphasized in Gothic architecture, which features almost skeletal stone structures with great expanses of glass, pared-down wall surfaces supported by external flying buttresses, pointed arches using the ogive shape, ribbed stone vaults, clustered columns, pinnacles and sharply pointed spires. Windows contain stained glass, showing stories from the Bible and from lives of saints. Such advances in design allowed cathedrals to rise taller than ever.The notable feature of this style is the hammerbeam roof.

Regions

Central Europe

Byzantine Empire

Bulgarian Empire

Scandinavia

Kievan Rus

See also 
 Medieval Serbian architecture
 List of medieval stone bridges in Germany
 List of medieval bridges in France

References

Further reading 
 Braun, Hugh, An Introduction to English Mediaeval Architecture, London: Faber and Faber, 1951.
 "Building the House of God: Architectural Metaphor and The Mystic Ark," Codex Aquilarensis: Revista de arte medieval (2016)
 Fletcher, Banister; Cruickshank, Dan, Sir Banister Fletcher's a History of Architecture, Architectural Press, 20th edition, 1996 (first published 1896). . Cf. Part Two, Chapter 13.
Hillson, J., Buchanan, A., Webb, N, Digital Analysis of Vaults in English Medieval Architecture, London: Taylor & Francis (2021).
 Rudolph, Conrad, "Building-Miracles as Artistic Justification in the Early and Mid-Twelfth Century," Radical Art History: Internationale Anthologie, ed. Wolfgang Kersten (1997) 398-410.
 Rudolph, Conrad, "The Architectural Metaphor in Western Medieval Artistic Culture: From the Cornerstone to The Mystic Ark," The Cambridge History of Religious Architecture, ed. Stephen Murray (2016).
 Rudolph, Conrad, "Medieval Architectural Theory, the Sacred Economy, and the Public Presentation of Monastic Architecture: The Classic Cistercian Plan," Journal of the Society of Architectural Historians 78 (2019) 259-275.

External links
The stave churches in Norway
Photographs and Plans of Crusader, Armenian and Byzantine Architecture in Turkey